The surname Eddy is used by descendants of a number of English, Irish and Scottish families.

Etymology 
Frank R. Holmes, in his Directory of the Ancestral Heads of New England Families, 1600-1700, proposes two possible origins; the Gaelic , "instructor", or from the Saxon ed and ea, "backwards" and "water", a whirlpool or eddy, making the surname Eddy a place-name. Another possible origin is the Saxon root ead, "success" or "prosperity". Ead occurs in numerous commonly used names, as Edgar, Edmund, Edward, Edwin, and the outdated Edwy. John Eddy of Taunton spells the name Eddway in the earliest record so far found. Eddy could also be a diminutive of any one of these names.

Robert Ferguson, in his work on English Surnames, believes that Eddy is a place-name: “Eday, Eady, Eddy are from ead, prosperity. Hence the name of the rock Eddiston, on which the celebrated light house is built. From this word are compounded a great number of Anglo-Saxon names of which we have Edward, Edmund, Edgar, Edw Edwin.”

Early history 
One of the first mentions that is close to the form of Eddy, is the name of the priest Eddi or Edde, Latinized into Eddius. He went to Northumbria from Canterbury with Bishop Wilfrid (or Wilfrith) in 669, and later took the name Stephanus. He taught the Roman method of chanting, and in 709 he was in the monastery of Ripon, where he wrote a life of Wilfrid in Latin.

In the Domesday Book, the name Eddeu is used in a description of Little Abington, Cambridgeshire, and during the time of Edward the First there were a number of people named Ede, Edde, and Edwy on the tax collection rolls of Worcestershire. There is a record in Hertfordshire, of a William Edy, Gentleman, in 1486. Edie, Eddy, Eddye, Edshune and Edye are found in numerous records in Gloucestershire from 1545 onward. At Woodbridge, Suffolk, Eyde is found as a surname between 1599 and 1610.

Starting from 1570 in the records of many parishes of the Archdeaconry Court of Cornwall, the following surnames are found: Edy, Eady, Eedy, Ede, Edye, Eddey, and Eddy. In Bristol, the town where William Eddye, the Vicar, was born, a number of wills from the late 16th century have the surname of Eddie, Eddye or Eddy. Ade, Adie, Addy, Eadie are common Scottish surnames. These may be forms of the name “Adam”. David Eadie of Moneaght, Scotland, was granted a coat of arms in 1672.

The surname in North America 
In North America, the largest family group who bears the Eddy surname are descended from two brothers, John and Samuel, who immigrated to America on October 29, 1630 on a ship called Handmaid. Their father, William Eddye, was the Vicar of the church in Cranbrook, England, from 1586–1616 and was born in Bristol in the mid-16th century. Other Northern American "patriarchs" are John Eddy who lived in Taunton, Massachusetts in the late 17th century; John Eddy of Woodbridge, New Jersey, (Scottish) who immigrated in the early 18th century; James Eddy, born in Dublin, Ireland, around 1712, and immigrated in 1753; Thomas Eddy, immigrated in the late 18th century to Fort Ann, New York, from Ireland; brothers William and John Eddy, immigrated from Ireland to New York city in the mid 19th century; and William Dave Eddy, who came to the United States from Cornwall, England, in 1887. There is a currently large family of Eddys in Cornwall.

Notable persons 
 Alan Eddy (1926–2017), English biochemist
 Allison Eddy, Canadian nephrologist
 Arthur Jerome Eddy (1859–1920), American lawyer, author, art collector, and art critic
 Barry Eddy (born 1952), Australian rules footballer
 Bill Eddy (fl. 1970s–2010s), American statistician
 Brett Eddy (born 1989), Australian rules footballer
 C. M. Eddy Jr. (1896–1967), American short story writer
 Cecil Ernest Eddy (1900–1956), Australian radiologist and physicist 
 Charles B. Eddy (active on 1880s), American cattle rancher, namesake for Eddy County, New Mexico
 Chris Eddy (born 1969), American Major League Baseball pitcher
 Chuck Eddy (born 1960), American music journalist
 Clarence Eddy (1851-1937), American organist and composer
 Cullen Eddy (born 1988), American professional ice hockey defenseman
 Daniel C. Eddy (1823–1896), American clergyman, hymn writer, politician, and author
 David M. Eddy (active since 1971), American physician, mathematician, and healthcare analyst
 Deborah Eddy (fl. 1990s–2010s), member of the Washington House of Representatives
 Dolph Eddy (1918–1989), Australian politician
 Don Eddy (1935–2017), American basketball coach
 Don Eddy (1946–2018), Major League Baseball pitcher
 Duane Eddy (born 1938), American guitarist
 Eddy Brothers, two American mediums best known in the 1870s, who claimed psychic powers
 Edward D. Eddy (1921–1998), American educator and college administrator
 Elizabeth Eddy (born 1991), American soccer midfielder
 Ezra Butler Eddy (1827–1906), Canadian businessman and political figure
 FannyAnn Eddy (1974–2004), murdered lesbian human rights defender from Sierra Leone
 Frank Eddy (1856–1929), American politician from Minnesota
 Gary Eddy (born 1945), Australian sprinter in the 1964 Summer Olympics
 George A. Eddy (1907–1998), American economist
 Helen Jerome Eddy (1897–1990), American motion picture actress
 Henry Turner Eddy (1844–1921), American science and engineering educator
 Ian C. Eddy (1906–1976), decorated American submarine commander during World War II
 James R. Eddy (born 1931), politician in the American state of Florida
 James Wade Eddy (1832–1916), American businessman, founder of Arizona Mineral Belt Railroad
 Jamie Eddy (born 1972), Canadian ice sledge hockey player
 Jerome Eddy (1829–1905), American businessman and politician from Michigan
 Jim Eddy (1936–2016), American football coach
 John Eddy (1915–1981), British sailor
 John A. Eddy (1931–2009), American astronomer
 Jonathan Eddy (c. 1726–1804), British-American soldier
 Kate Eddy (born 1996), Australian netball player
 Keith Eddy (born 1944), English retired footballer
 Lori Eddy (born 1971), Canadian curler 
 Manton S. Eddy (1892–1962), American general
 Mary Baker Eddy (1821–1910), the American founder of the Church of Christ, Scientist church
 Mary Pierson Eddy (1864–1923), religious and medical missionary
 Mike Eddy (born 1952), American stock car auto racer
 Nelson Eddy (1901–1967), American singer
 Nick Eddy (born 1944), American pro football player
 Norman Eddy (1810–1872), American politician and military officer
 Paul L. Eddy (1899-1979), American farmer, businessman, and politician
 Ray Eddy (1911–1986), American college basketball coach
 Richard Eddy (clergyman) (1828–1906), American Universalist clergyman
 Richard Eddy (politician) (1882–1955), New Zealand labourer, trade unionist and member of the New Zealand Legislative Council
 Robert Eddy (born 1988), Australian rules footballer
 Roger Eddy (born 1946), Canadian former luger
 Roger L. Eddy (born 1958), member of the Illinois House of Representatives
 Ronald Eddy (born c. 1931), Canadian politician
 Samuel Eddy (1769–1839), U.S. Representative from Rhode Island
 Samuel E. Eddy (1822–1909), American soldier who fought in the American Civil War
 Sara Hershey-Eddy (née Sarah Hershey; 1837–1911), American musician
 Sarah J. Eddy (1851–1945), American artist, photographer and suffragette
 Sarah Stoddard Eddy (1831-1904), American social reformer and clubwoman
 Sean Eddy (born circa 1966), bioinformatician
 Shelia Eddy (born 1996), American convicted of murder
 Sherwood Eddy (1871–1963), American Protestant missionary, administrator and educator
 Sonya Eddy (1967-2022), American actress
 Spencer F. Eddy (1873–1939), American diplomat who served as U.S. Minister to Argentina and Romania
 Steve Eddy (born 1957), American baseball pitcher
 T. V. Eddy (1853–1918), American politician in the state of Washington
 Thomas Eddy (1758–1827), New York merchant, philanthropist and politician
 Thomas Mears Eddy (1823–1874), American clergyman and author
 Victor Eddy (born 1955), West Indies cricketer
 William A. Eddy (1896–1962), American academic and intelligence officer
 William Abner Eddy (1850–1909), American accountant and journalist famous for his experiments with kites
 William C. Eddy (1902–1989), American naval officer, submariner, engineer, television producer, educator, cartoonist, artist, inventor, entrepreneur, explorer, writer
 William F. Eddy (1852–1930), Canadian political figure from Saskatchewan

Further reading 
Eddy Family publications
 
 
 

 
 
 
Eddy, Rev. Thomas A., ed. (2005). The Eddy Family in America. Supplement 2005. Middleboro, Massachusetts: The Eddy Family Association, Inc.

Directories

References

External links 
 Eddy Family Association – Genealogy

English-language surnames
Genome projects